Brockhoff is a surname. Notable people with the surname include: 

 Belle Brockhoff (born 1993), Australian snowboarder
 David Brockhoff (1928–2011), Australian rugby union identity, a state and national representative
 Klaus Brockhoff (born 1939), German economist and organizational theorist
 Stefan Brockhoff, pseudonym that was used collectively by a group of three German co-authors of several detective novels
 Dieter Cunz (1910–1969)
 Richard Plant (1910–1998)
 Oskar Seidlin (1911–1984)